Maria, officially the Municipality of Maria, is a 5th class municipality in the province of Siquijor, Philippines. According to the 2020 census, it has a population of 14,385.

Geography

Barangays
Maria comprises 22 barangays:

Climate

Demographics

Economy

References

External links
 Maria Profile at PhilAtlas.com
 [ Philippine Standard Geographic Code]

Municipalities of Siquijor